Rhys Henry Hughes (born 1966, Cardiff, Wales) is a Welsh fantasy writer and essayist.

Career

Born in Cardiff, Hughes has written in a variety of forms, from short stories to novels.

His long novel Engelbrecht Again! is a sequel to Maurice Richardson's 1950 cult classic The Exploits of Engelbrecht and is the most radical of Hughes's books, making extensive use of lipograms, typographical tricks, coded passages and other OuLiPo techniques.

His main project consists of authoring a 1,000-story cycle of both tightly and loosely interconnected tales.

Bibliography

Novels 

 The Percolated Stars: An Astro-Caffeine Romp in Three Cups Featuring Batavus Droogstoppel Merchant and Scientist and Bourgeois Monster: One Lump or Two? (RazorBlade Press; 2003)
 Engelbrecht Again! (Dead Letter Press; 2008)
 Mister Gum; Or: The Possibly Phoney Profundity of Puerility (Dog Horn Publishing; 2009)
 Twisthorn Bellow (Atomic Fez Publishing; 2010)
 The Abnormalities of Stringent Strange (Meteor House; 2013)
 The Young Dictator (Pillar International Publishing; 2013)
 Captains Stupendous; Or, the Fantastical Family Faraway (expansion of The Coandă Effect: A Corto Maltese Adventure) (Telos Moonrise; 2014; 
 The Pilgrim's Regress (Gloomy Seahorse Press; 2014)
 Cloud Farming in Wales (Snuggly Books; 2017)
 The Honeymoon Gorillas (Bizarro Pulp Press; 2018)

Novellas 

 Eyelidiad (1996)
 Rawhead & Bloody Bones (1998)
 Elusive Plato (1998)
 The Crystal Cosmos (PS Publishing; December 2007)
 The Coandă Effect (Ex Occidente Press; November 2010)
 The Sticky Situations of Zwicky Fingers (Gloomy Seahorse Press; 2014)
 World Muses (Ex Occidente Press; 2017)
 Students of Myself (Elsewhen Press; 2014)
 My Rabbit's Shadow Looks Like a Hand (Eibonvale Press; 2021)
 The Ghost Loser (Gibbon Moon Books; 2022)
 Three Novellas (The Darktree Wheel, The Impossible Inferno, The Swine Taster) (Gibbon Moon Books; 2022)

Collections 

 Worming the Harpy and Other Bitter Pills (Tartarus Press, 1995)
 The Smell of Telescopes (Tartarus Press, 2000)
 Stories from a Lost Anthology (Tartarus Press, 2002)
 Nowhere Near Milk Wood (1997, expanded 2002)
 Journeys Beyond Advice (2002)
 A New Universal History of Infamy (2004): a parody of and homage to Jorge Luis Borges's collection A Universal History of Infamy.
 The Less Lonely Planet (Humdrumming, Ltd.; May 2008)
 The Postmodern Mariner (Screaming Dreams; June 2008)
 The Brothel Creeper (Gray Friar Press; March 2011)
 Link Arms With Toads! (Chômu Press; May 2011)
 Tallest Stories (Eibonvale Press; January 2013)
 The Just Not So Stories (Exaggerated Press; October 2013)
 More Than a Feline (Gloomy Seahorse Press; December 2013)
 Flash in the Pantheon (Gloomy Seahorse Press; 2014)
 Rhysop's Fables (Gloomy Seahorse Press; 2014)
 Bone Idle in the Charnel House (Hippocampus Press; 2014)
 Orpheus on the Underground (Tartarus Press; 2015)
 Mirrors in the Deluge (Elsewhen Press; 2015)
 Brutal Pantomimes (Egaeus Press; 2016)
 Salty Kiss Island (Immanion Press; 2017)
 How Many Times? (Eibonvale Press; 2018)
 Crepuscularks and Phantomimes (Raphus Press; 2020) 
 Weirdly Out West (Black Scat Books; 2021)
 Utopia in Trouble (Raphus Press; 2021)
 Comfy Rascals (Raphus Press;2022)
 The Senile Pagodas (Centipede Press; 2022)

Poetry 

 The Gloomy Seahorse (Gloomy Seahorse Press; 2014)
 Bunny Queue (ImpSpired Press; 2021)
 Robot Poems (Gibbon Moon Books; 2022)

Ebooks 

 The Rhys Hughes Fantastic MEGAPACK® (Wildside Press; 2022)

References

External links
 The Spoons That Are My Ears!, Rhys Hughes's weblog
 Rhys Hughes, the man who laughs at goldfish, interview by Steve Redwood
 Interview at Weird Fiction Review, 7 March 2016

1966 births
Living people
British science fiction writers
Welsh writers
Welsh essayists
Welsh male novelists
Welsh short story writers
Welsh fantasy writers
Welsh horror writers
Welsh science fiction writers
Writers from Cardiff